Philaeus may refer to:

In Greek mythology:
Philaeus (son of Ajax), a son of Ajax and Lysidice 
Philaeus, a son of Munichus and Lelante

In biology:
Philaeus, a spider genus
Philaeus chrysops, a species in this genus
Philaeus multicolor, a synonym for Paraphidippus aurantius
Philaeus farneus, a synonym for Phidippus audax